Perilla de Castro is a municipality in the province of Zamora, Castile and León, Spain. According to the 2004 census (INE), the municipality had a population of 230 inhabitants at that time.

References 

Municipalities of the Province of Zamora